The 41st New York Infantry Regiment was an infantry regiment that served in the American Civil War. They were nicknamed De Kalb Regiment. The regiment was formed from German immigrants from both New York and Pennsylvania. Initially, the regiment wore a uniform that was based on the Jaeger uniform of Germany.  It consisted of a dark green frock coat with red trimming and cuff flaps, dark green pants with a red stripe down the leg, a dark green kepi with a red band, and black shoes.  In addition to the Jaeger uniform, Company K of the regiment wore a French/American zouave uniform.  This uniform consisted of a dark blue zouave jacket with red trimmings, dark blue pantaloons with red braiding, a sky blue sash, a dark blue zouave vest with red trimming, a red tasseled fez with a thin yellow band around it, and white gaiters.

See also
List of New York Civil War units

References

Infantry 041
Military units and formations established in 1861
1861 establishments in New York (state)
Military units and formations disestablished in 1863